Sarrothripini is a tribe of subfamily Chloephorinae of the moth family Nolidae.

Genera
Bena Billberg, 1820
Bryophilopsis  Hampson, 1894
Characoma Walker, 1863
Chloethripa Hampson, 1912
Dilophothripa Hampson, 1898
Etanna Walker, 1862
Garella Walker, 1863
Giaura Walker, 1863
Gyrtothripa Hampson, 1912
Mniothripa Hampson, 1912
Nycteola Hübner, 1822
Pardasena Walker, 1866
Pseudoips Hübner, 1822

References

Chloephorinae
Moth tribes